The heat shock protein Hsp20 family, also known as small heat shock proteins (sHSPs), is a family of heat shock proteins.

Prokaryotic and eukaryotic organisms respond to heat shock or other environmental stress by inducing the synthesis of proteins collectively known as heat-shock proteins (hsp). Amongst them is a family of proteins with an average molecular weight of 20 kDa, known as the hsp20 proteins. These seem to act as protein chaperones that can protect other proteins against heat-induced denaturation and aggregation. Hsp20 proteins seem to form large heterooligomeric aggregates. Structurally, this family is characterised by the presence of a conserved C-terminal domain, alpha-crystallin domain, of about 100 residues. Recently, small heat shock proteins (sHSPs) were found in marine viruses (cyanophages).

Function and regulation 

Hsp20, like all heat shock proteins, is in abundance when cells are under stressed conditions. Hsp20 is known to be expressed in many human tissues, including the brain and heart. Hsp20 has been studied extensively in cardiac myocytes and is known to act as a chaperon protein, binding to protein kinase 1 (PDK1) and allowing its nuclear transport. In addition, the phosphorylation of hsp20 has been shown to effect the structure of cells cytoskeletons. Due to hsp20 commonly forming dimers with itself when heated, its function of chaperoning can be greatly affected.

Human small heat shock proteins 
HSPB1
HSPB2
HSPB3
HSPB4 (CRYAA)
HSPB5 (CRYAB)
HSPB6
HSPB7
HSPB8     
HSPB9
HSPB10

References

Heat shock proteins